Itäharju-Varissuo (Finnish; Österås-Kråkkärret in Swedish) is a ward of Turku, Finland, also known as Ward 4. The ward is located to the east of the city and named after Itäharju and Varissuo, two major districts in the ward.

Itäharju-Varissuo has a population of 27,883 and an annual population decrease of 1.26%. 17.75% of the ward's population are under 15 years old, while 13.21% are over 65. It is probably the most multicultural of the city's wards, and this is reflected in the linguistic makeup, which is 84.17% Finnish, 3.06% Swedish, and 12.77% other.

Districts
The ward consists of nine districts. One of them is divided with another ward.

See also 
Districts of Turku
Wards of Turku

Wards of Turku